AIDAprima is the  flagship of AIDA Cruises, built by Mitsubishi Shipbuilding at their shipyard in Nagasaki, Japan. The cruise ship entered service on April 25, 2016, after suffering several construction delays. She is the first AIDA vessel not to be built in Meyer Werft since the completion of AIDAaura in 2003. She is also the first Carnival Corporation & plc vessel to be built in Mitsubishi since the completion of the Sapphire Princess in 2004.

History 

Originally, the vessel was planned for delivery in the first half of 2015, with an inaugural trip to 22 countries, but the shipbuilder was unable to complete the vessel on time and the delivery was postponed to December 2015 after several minor accidents during construction. The ship was christened on 7 May 2016 in Hamburg, Germany as part of the 827th Hamburg Port Anniversary (Hafengeburtstag). The ship's godmother is German child actor Emma Schweiger.

In September 2017, AIDAprima was one of the guests at the Hamburg Cruise Days and a part the Blue Port light show.

Design 
The vessel has a capacity of 3,300 passengers and 900 crew members. AIDAprima has 18 passenger decks, 15 dining options, indoor and outdoor pools, as well as shops, cafes, and bars.
The AIDA Beach Club pool area, which is covered by a transparent UV-permeable membrane dome, allows passengers to relax in a beach setting with natural light despite inclement weather. The Four Elements features the longest indoor water slide on a cruise ship, a rock climbing wall, and a lazy river. At night, the Beach Club serves as a discotheque, with stars or laser shows projected onto the dome.

Engineering 
AIDAprima is driven by three MaK 12VM43C diesel engines and one MaK 12VM46DF dual-fuel (LNG/oil) engine, which give 53,150 hp to the propulsion system. The engine has computer-controlled fuel injection to increase fuel economy. The ship is propelled by ABB Azipod XO units, which allows a service speed of 22 kts.

The AIDAprima uses Mitsubishi Heavy Industries's proprietary Mitsubishi Air Lubrication System (MALS), which releases small air bubbles to cover the bottom of the vessel, reducing the friction between the hull and the surrounding water. This is predicted to reduce CO2 emissions and fuel consumption by more than 7%.

References

External links
AIDAprima Cruise Ship

Ships of AIDA Cruises
2014 ships
Ships built by Mitsubishi Heavy Industries